During the 1982–83 English football season, Leicester City F.C. competed in the Football League Second Division.

Season summary
In August 1982, Gordon Milne left Coventry City to join Leicester as their new boss. The 1982–83 season didn't start well for the Foxes with just 6 wins in their first 16 league games which saw Leicester in 15th and looked like their promotion challenge was over. Then from December onwards until the end of the season, Leicester lost only 4 league games during their impressive league form and finished the season unbeaten in 15 league matches. Heading to the final league game, Leicester were ahead of Fulham on goal difference knowing a slip up would see the Cottagers leapfrog them to automatic promotion. With Leicester only holding relegated Burnley to a 0-0 draw at home, it gave Fulham a chance to do so at Derby County but with only a win required. An incident involving a spectator and a Fulham player led to the game being abandoned 2 minutes away from the 90 minute mark with Fulham losing 1-0 at the Baseball Ground. An enquiry from the Football League was held for a few days and they decided eventually the result from the Derby-Fulham game would stand which meant the Foxes were promoted after 2 seasons in the second tier.

Final league table

Results
Leicester City's score comes first

Legend

Football League Second Division

FA Cup

League Cup

Squad

References

Leicester City F.C. seasons
Leicester City